The men's 10,000 metres event at the 1986 World Junior Championships in Athletics was held in Athens, Greece, at Olympic Stadium on 16 July.

Medalists

Results

Final
16 July

Participation
According to an unofficial count, 22 athletes from 15 countries participated in the event.

References

10,000 metres
Long distance running at the World Athletics U20 Championships